Edward Jonathan Lowe (24 March 1950 – 5 January 2014), usually cited as E. J. Lowe but known personally as Jonathan Lowe, was a British philosopher and academic. He was Professor of Philosophy at Durham University.

Biography
Lowe was born in Dover, England. His secondary education was at Bushey Grammar School, and he subsequently studied at the University of Cambridge, 1968–72 (BA in History, 1st Class), and the University of Oxford, 1972–75 (BPhil and DPhil in Philosophy).

Philosophical work
Lowe was one of the leading philosophers of his generation. He mainly researched and published in metaphysics, philosophy of mind, philosophical logic, and the history of early modern philosophy. He supervised many PhD students, working on a wide variety of topics.

One of his contributions was a sophisticated defense of dualistic interactionism in the philosophy of mind. This is the view that the mind and the brain are distinct substances, and that facts about each are "causally relevant" to the other.

Publications 
 Kinds of Being: A Study of Individuation, Identity and the Logic of Sortal Terms (Oxford: Blackwell, 1989)
 Locke on Human Understanding (London: Routledge, 1995) 
 Subjects of Experience (Cambridge: Cambridge University Press, 1996) 
 The Possibility of Metaphysics (Oxford: Oxford University Press, 1998)
 An Introduction to the Philosophy of Mind (Cambridge: Cambridge University Press, 2000)
 A Survey of Metaphysics (Oxford: Oxford University Press, 2002)
 Locke (London, New York: Routledge: 2005)
 The Four-Category Ontology: A Metaphysical Foundation for Natural Science (Oxford: Oxford University Press, 2006)
 Personal Agency (Oxford: Oxford University Press, 2007)
 More Kinds of Being: A Further Study of Individuation, Identity, and the Logic of Sortal Terms (Wiley-Blackwell, 2009)
 Forms of Thought: A Study in Philosophical Logic (Cambridge University Press, 2013)

He also published over 200 articles, including in the leading journals in the field, such as The Journal of Philosophy, Mind, and Noûs.

References

External links 
"E.J. Lowe", article in the Internet Encyclopedia of Philosophy by J.T.M. Miller outlining central parts of Lowe's philosophy, especially his metaphysics, ontology, and philosophy of mind.
"Metaphysical foundations for science," interviewed by Richard Marshall at 3:AM Magazine, 18 March 2013.
"Recent Advances in Metaphysics", Lowe's keynote address, about his four-category ontology, at the International Conference on Formal Ontology in Information systems 17-19 October 2001, Ogunquit, Maine.

1950 births
2014 deaths
21st-century British philosophers
Academics of Durham University
Alumni of Fitzwilliam College, Cambridge
Alumni of St Edmund Hall, Oxford
British logicians
Metaphysicians
People from Dover, Kent
Philosophers of mind
Scholars of modern philosophy